WJAT (800 AM) is a radio station broadcasting a News Talk Information format. It is licensed to Swainsboro, Georgia, United States. The station is currently owned by Radiojones, LLC and features programming from Fox News Radio, Fox Sports Radio, and Premiere Networks.

References

External links

JAT